Pleasant Township is one of the seventeen townships of Hancock County, Ohio, United States. As of the 2010 census, the population was 2,471, of whom 823 lived in the unincorporated portions of the township.

Geography
Located in the northwestern corner of the county, it borders the following townships:
Jackson Township, Wood County - north
Henry Township, Wood County - northeast corner
Portage Township - east
Liberty Township - southeast corner
Blanchard Township - south
Blanchard Township, Putnam County - southwest corner
Van Buren Township, Putnam County - west
Bartlow Township, Henry County - northwest corner

The village of McComb is located in eastern Pleasant Township.

Name and history
It is one of fifteen Pleasant Townships statewide.

Pleasant Township was organized in 1835.

Government
The township is governed by a three-member board of trustees, who are elected in November of odd-numbered years to a four-year term beginning on the following January 1. Two are elected in the year after the presidential election and one is elected in the year before it. There is also an elected township fiscal officer, who serves a four-year term beginning on April 1 of the year after the election, which is held in November of the year before the presidential election. Vacancies in the fiscal officership or on the board of trustees are filled by the remaining trustees.

References

External links

Townships in Hancock County, Ohio
Townships in Ohio